The political status of the Cook Islands and Niue is formally defined as being states in free association within the Realm of New Zealand, which is made up of the Cook Islands, Niue, and New Zealand and its territories, Tokelau and the Ross Dependency. The Cook Islands and Niue have full constitutional independence from New Zealand and act as independent countries. Some countries have recognised them as sovereign entities and established diplomatic relations. However, New Zealand may carry out defence and foreign affairs on behalf of the two associated states when requested.

Sovereignty and self-government

New Zealand is officially responsible for the defence and foreign affairs of the Cook Islands and Niue. The Act of the New Zealand Parliament which established self governance mentions a role for New Zealand, but the constitution of the Cook Islands does not.  However, these responsibilities confer New Zealand no rights of control and can only be exercised at the request of the Cook Islands and Niue. The Cook Islands and Niue have been recognised as sovereign states by some countries, and maintain diplomatic relations under their own name. The United States recognises the Cook Islands as a self-governing territory, and has signed treaties with the Cook Islands government. Moreover, the Secretary General of the United Nations has determined that the admission of the Cook Islands and Niue into the World Health Assembly means that they have been accepted as states by the international community.

Although the Cook Islands and Niue behave as sovereign states in international law, their constitutional statuses within the Realm of New Zealand (i.e., for matters of New Zealand domestic law) is different from that of a fully independent state, considering that all of Niue's and the Cook Islands' nationals are automatically New Zealand citizens, and both have New Zealand's Monarch as their own head of state. Neither the Cook Islands nor Niue has decided to join the United Nations, as New Zealand has expressed a view that such a move would lead to their loss of the right to automatic acquisition of New Zealand citizenship. However, New Zealand has never formally opposed such application, nor has it argued that either country would not be within its sovereign right to do so. Some scholars have argued that a lack of separate Cook Islands citizenship places an effective limit on the ability of the Cook Islands to act as a sovereign entity, while others have argued that the participation of the Cook Islands in international organisations (such as the Pacific Islands Forum) shows that Cook Islands sovereignty is not limited by the free association arrangement.

History 
Formerly dependencies of New Zealand, the Cook Islands became a state in free association with New Zealand on August 4, 1965; Niue became a state in free association on October 19, 1974, after a constitutional referendum. In 1992, the UN recognised both states' right to establish diplomatic relations with other countries. Since then, both the Cook Islands and Niue have been allowed to attend UN-sponsored conferences open to "all States" as well as sign and ratify UN treaties open to "non-member states".

New Zealand has formally allowed the Cook Islands to independently conduct its own foreign affairs since April 6, 2001. Niue was granted this power in 2007.

The Repertory of Practice of United Nations Organs records that in 1988 "New Zealand stated that its future participation in international agreements would no longer extend to" Niue and the Cook Islands. The Cook Islands and Niue were granted membership of UNESCO by 1993 and of the World Health Organization by 1994. Also by 1994, the UN Secretariat had "recognized the full treaty-making capacity ... of Niue". As of 2022, the Cook Islands, Kosovo, and Niue are the only state parties that participate in UN specialised agencies, but which are not member states of the UN nor observer states with the United Nations General Assembly. Additionally, the Republic of China on Taiwan participated in the World Health Assembly as Chinese Taipei from 2009 to 2016.

In September 2022, the United States announced its recognition of the Cook Islands and Niue as sovereign states during President Biden's Summit with Pacific Islands Countries (PIC) Leaders in Washington, United States.

Positions taken by states

Countries with which the Cook Islands or Niue has diplomatic relations

States that recognise the Cook Islands and Niue as self-governing territories

The Cook Islands and Niue as microstates
While their respective relationships with New Zealand, as well as their small size, make them rather unusual states, it has been argued that their status is far from unique. According to Zbigniew Dumienski, both the Cook Islands and Niue can be seen as microstates, which are defined as: "modern protected states, i.e. sovereign states that have been able to unilaterally depute certain attributes of sovereignty to larger powers in exchange for benign protection of their political and economic viability against their geographic or demographic constraints." Both the Cook Islands and Niue, as well as such states as Andorra, Liechtenstein, Monaco, San Marino, and Vatican City, fit into this definition of microstates.

References

Citations

Bibliography

 

Sovereignty
Cook Islands
Niue
Realm of New Zealand